Lebyazhye is a rural locality (a selo) and the administrative center of Lebyazhyevsky Selsoviet of Seryshevsky District, Amur Oblast, Russia. The population was 365 as of 2018. There are 4 streets.

Geography 
Lebyazhye is located on the Tom River, 26 km southwest of Seryshevo (the district's administrative centre) by road. Belousovka is the nearest rural locality.

References 

Rural localities in Seryshevsky District